Faenor may refer to:

Places
Faenor, Ceredigion, Wales
Y Faenor, the Welsh name for Vaynor in Merthyr Tydfil, Wales

Not to be confused with
Fëanor, a fictional character by JRR Tolkien